Lycée Jean-Moulin may refer to:
 Lycée Jean-Moulin (Angers)
  in Blanc-Mesnil (Seine-Saint-Denis, Île-de-France)
  in Draguignan (Var, Provence-Alpes-Côte d'Azur)
 Lycée Jean-Moulin (Lyon)
  in Pézenas (Hérault, Languedoc-Roussillon).
 Lycée Jean Moulin (Torcy, Seine-et-Marne)
 Cité Scolaire Jean Moulin - Albertville